Planochelas is a genus of African araneomorph spiders in the family Trachelidae, first described by R. Lyle & C. R. Haddad in 2009.  it contains only three species from Ghana, Uganda, and Ivory Coast.

References

Araneomorphae genera
Trachelidae